Syrna is a mountain village and a community in the municipal unit of Trikolonoi, western Arcadia, Greece. Syrna is situated on a mountain slope above the right bank of the river Alfeios, at about 800 m elevation. In 2011 Syrna had a population of 60 for the village and 62 for the community, which includes the village Ano Kalyvia. Syrna is 2 km northwest of Palamari, 4 km southeast of Elliniko, 6 km northeast of Karytaina and 6 km southeast of Stemnitsa.

Population

See also
List of settlements in Arcadia

References

External links
History and information about Syrna
 Syrna on the GTP Travel Pages

Trikolones
Populated places in Arcadia, Peloponnese